Maria Galvany or María Galvany (1878? - 2 August 1927) was a Spanish coloratura soprano known for her showy, virtuoso singing technique. Her career, however, ended in obscurity.

Her biography and operatic engagements
Very little is known about the life of this singer. It is generally accepted that she was born in 1878 in Granada, Spain, though the exact year and date of her birth are disputed (some sources give 1874 or 1876). She appears to have studied, however, at the Madrid Royal Conservatory under Lázaro María Puig and Napoleone Verger, and made her operatic debut in the title role of Gaetano Donizetti's Lucia di Lammermoor at Cartagena around 1896.

While in Spain, her repertoire included operas such as La Sonnambula, La Traviata, Hamlet, Lakmé, and Les Huguenots (all sung in Italian). After becoming a favorite of the Spanish public, she went on to sing in Italy. Apparently she never sang at La Scala; instead, she performed at Milan's Teatro Dal Verme in 1901. Two years later, she performed with success at Parma in La Sonnambula, alongside Piero Schiavazzi. During 1905 she toured parts of Europe, singing in the Netherlands, Belgium, and France as part of the Castellano Company, which also included tenor Nicola Zerola and soprano Adelina Agostinelli.

Her 1908 Venice performance of Ophelia in Ambroise Thomas's Hamlet was particularly successful, as were her appearances in London. Although there is no historical evidence that she ever appeared at the Covent Garden Theatre, she sang in the Theatre Royal, Drury Lane in 1909, performing in Dinorah, Il Barbiere di Siviglia and La Sonnambula. Later, she appeared at the Coliseum Theatre with Antonio Sabellico and Elvino Ventura as singing partners.  Several other appearances in Lisbon (Coliseu dos Recreios, 21.05.1914), Nice and various Russian cities are also recorded.

After this successful period in Europe, she embarked to South America, where she became especially popular in Brazil and Argentina. She allegedly performed only once in the United States, appearing in vaudeville in San Francisco during 1918, but she never managed to sing at New York's Metropolitan Opera House.

At this point, information about her career dwindles. It is claimed that she settled in Rio de Janeiro, Brazil, where she probably became a singing teacher and gave occasional concerts. By the time of her death she was almost forgotten and the news of her death never appeared in the press. Until the 1990s it was commonly believed that she had died on August 2, 1927, in the San Luis Asylum, an old people's retirement home in Rio de Janeiro. However a Brazilian doctor, Jacques Alain León, claims that she was in fact killed by influenza in 1918, and that it was a dramatic soprano named Fanny Maria Rollas Galvani who actually died in 1949 in Rio.

Recordings
Galvany made acoustic records for four different firms. Her earliest recordings date back to 1903 and were cut by the Gramophone and Typewriter Company (G&T). Later on, she recorded for Pathé Records and came back to G&T in 1906, where she made her most popular discs, including ensembles with major stars of her time, such as Fernando de Lucia and Titta Ruffo, as well as with less well remembered singers like Aristodemo Giorgini, Remo Andreini and Andrea Perelló de Segurola. She also made several records for the Edison Company around 1911. Her repertoire consisted mainly of Italian opera arias, zarzuela pieces and concert songs. Sadly, only a few of her recordings are preserved or have been reissued for the general public, so no exact discography exists.

Nevertheless, her surviving recordings are today as controversial in terms of their artistic worth as they were 100 years ago. This is due to her staggering use of intricate coloratura passages mined with machine-gun-like staccato and other equally shocking vocal tricks that often give an infamously comic impression of her musical taste. This has caused many listeners to think of Galvany as nothing more than an unusually gifted vocal technician. Commentators have gone as far as to compare her high E flats to a whistling kettle.

This negative view is supported to some extent by her repeated interpolation of  flute/voice cadenzas, sometimes twice during the same aria, that often have no relation to the original piece. Such practices were fairly common in her era, however, when performers often took a less literal view of the written notes of a composer's score. In addition, the natural timbre of Galvany's upper register did not record well, which often results in an irritating, wiry sound that is unappealing to most modern ears. Also, her interpretations are burdened with rapid tempi, a hard vibrato, unexpected register shifts and throat-clearing sounds, together with section cuts caused by the limited duration of 78-rpm discs.

On the other hand, Galvany is still admired for the sweetness of her middle register, for possessing a remarkable sense of pitch, and for her remarkable ability to dispatch complicated fioritura. Her duets with the great baritone Titta Ruffo are probably her best known recordings today.

Media
{{listen |
  | filename = Galvany_-_L'incantatrice_(Arditi_-_1907).ogg
  | title = L'incantatrice
  | description = Maria Galvany's breath-taking vocal virtuosity is evident in this 1907 recorded version of Luigi Arditi's "L'incantatrice" 
|}}

 References 

 Sources 
Nicholas E. Limansky. Oxford's Opera Quarterly Journal. #20: 505-512. 2004.
 Leo Riemens. Notes to the Maria Galvany's Lebendige Vergangenheit CD''. Historic Recordings, Austro Mechana. 2003.

External links 
The Cylinder Preservation and Digitization Project: Maria Galvany – Maria Galvany's 1910 rendition in Italian of "Der Hölle Rache" from Mozart's Die Zauberflöte. Downloadable mp3 file.

1870s births
1927 deaths
People from Granada
Spanish operatic sopranos
Singers from Andalusia
Vaudeville performers
Madrid Royal Conservatory alumni
19th-century Spanish women opera singers
20th-century Spanish women opera singers